Risen Christ Catholic Church is located in Air Itam, Penang, Malaysia. The church was established in 1968 and is also a parish in the Roman Catholic Diocese of Penang.

History
In June 1968, the diocese bought a bungalow and renovated it into a chapel. This chapel was blessed by Bishop Gregory Yong, the then bishop of Penang. The church was renovated again in 1978 and it was blessed by Bishop Anthony Soter Fernandez. The parish house was also opened. In the years 1988 and 2003, three plots of land were bought, thus expanding the church grounds.

In 2002, a parish census was taken by Fr. Augustine Wong, former parish priest. It was estimated that there are 2,000 Catholics residing around the Air Itam and Paya Terubong, an increase of the population here. At that period of time, the parish centre was launched. The parish centre, a 3-storey building with a hall and classrooms for functions and catechism classes were opened in January 2009. The bungalow located within the church grounds were also renovated and in August 2009, the priests residence and parish office were moved there.

In September 2009, the old church was handed over to the contractor for renovation. The church was redesigned and in October 2010, the newly renovated church was ready. The dedication ceremony of this church was held on 1 January 2011, Bishop Antony Selvanayagam dedicated the newly renovated church. Currently, the parish priest post is held by Fr. Esmond and he is assisted by Fr.Crispus

Mass Times
Daily Masses  
6.55 am English (Mon-Fri)
1st Fri-Adoration & Mass (7.30 pm)

Saturday Service  
Novena : 5:30pm English  
Sunset Mass : 6:00pm English

Sunday Masses 
8:30am English 
10:30am Mandarin 
5:30pm Tamil

References

External links
 Official Site
 Penang Diocese Official Website

Northeast Penang Island District
Roman Catholic churches in Penang